Two of a Kind is an American sitcom that aired on ABC as part of the network's TGIF line-up, starring Mary-Kate and Ashley Olsen in their first television series since Full House ended in 1995. The show aired from September 25, 1998 to July 9, 1999.

The series was produced by Griffard/Adler Productions, Dualstar Productions, and Miller-Boyett-Warren Productions, in association with Warner Bros. Television. It was the last series to be produced by Miller-Boyett Productions prior to the company's initial shutdown in 1999.

Premise
Kevin Burke (Christopher Sieber) is a college professor and widower father living in Chicago, Illinois, who believes there is a scientific explanation for everything except how to control his scheming 11, then 12-year-old daughters. Mary-Kate and Ashley Burke (Mary-Kate and Ashley Olsen) are twin sisters, who are complete opposites; Mary-Kate is a tomboy whose biggest interest is perfecting her jumpshot and curveball and whose worst subject in school is math. Ashley is a girly girl who makes straight As and dreams of a modeling career and dancing. Kevin's wife died prior to the series.

The other main character is Carrie (Sally Wheeler), a 26-year-old woman in Kevin's class, who has come late to college after exploring the world. Carrie is quirky, difficult, beautiful, and quick to speak her mind, so when she answers Kevin's ad for a part-time baby sitter for the girls, he is convinced she's nothing but trouble and is in favor of their next door neighbor Mrs. Baker  baby sitting Mary-Kate and Ashley. The girls think she is a dream-sitter come true, and agree to put their differences aside to join forces to make a little chemistry between their by-the-book father and the beautiful woman who seems to drive him crazy in all the right ways.

Cast and characters

Main

 Mary-Kate Olsen as Mary-Kate Burke – A 12-year-old tomboy who loves sports, horses, and modeling. She has two friends, Max and Brian. She also has a math tutor named Taylor. Mary-Kate suffers from Dyscalculia. Mary-Kate's favorite color is red.
 Ashley Olsen as Ashley Burke – A 12-year-old girly girl who loves fashion, dancing, make up, cheerleading, and modeling. Ashley's a Straight A student. She's better at math than Mary-Kate. Ashley also has a first crush when Mary Kate's math tutor Taylor Donovan came over. She's friends with Nicole and the popular Jennifer Dilber. In "Carrie Moves In" Ashley joins Mary-Kate's karate class. Ashley's favorite color is green.
 Christopher Sieber as Kevin Burke – The widower father of Mary-Kate and Ashley, a professor and landlord. He has been on many dates with women, but they never work. He teaches Carrie, the girls' cool babysitter. Kevin's wife Jan died when Mary-Kate and Ashley were in the 3rd grade. Kevin plays the saxophone.
 Sally Wheeler as Carrie Moore – The twins' cool babysitter and student, friend, and employee of Professor Burke. She has a great sense of humor and a free-spirit. Carrie eventually moves into the Burkes’ basement after Kevin accidentally causes her to get evicted from her apartment.
 Orlando Brown as Max – Mary-Kate and Ashley's other guy friend. He also goes to school with the twins. He seems to be very close with Brian.
 David Valcin as Edward "Eddie" Fairbanks – Kevin's best friend since childhood, a divorcee and professional plumber. He is known for constantly hitting on women and butting heads with Carrie.
 Jesse Lee as Taylor Donovan – Mary-Kate's math tutor and Ashley's main love interest.
 Martin Spanjers as Brian – Mary-Kate and Ashley's friend who has a crush on Ashley. Brian is known to flirt with every girl at school. He goes to school with the twins where he is usually seen trying to flirt with Ashley. He seems to be in the same grade as the twins and Max.
 Ernie Grunwald as Paul – Carrie's classmate and is a student of Kevin. He also has a Saturday job as a pizza delivery guy. He has a crush on Carrie but is too afraid to admit it. In one of the episodes, Paul sees Carrie at the professor's house late at night, and Kevin worries that Paul "got the wrong idea". Paul is a computer whiz.

Recurring
 David Lascher as Matthew "Matt" Burke – Kevin's irresponsible younger brother and the twins uncle. He briefly dated Carrie.
 Anastasia Emmons as Jennifer Dilber – Ashley's friend. Jennifer is the most popular girl in 7th Grade. Ashley invites Jennifer to a sleepover that she has in the hopes of becoming popular and getting to sit with her at lunch.
 Kimberly J. Brown as Nicole – Ashley's other friend. Mary-Kate becomes jealous when Ashley spends more time with Nicole than her. After "My Boyfriend's Back" Nicole isn't seen or mentioned again.
 Vanessa Lock as Dr. Martinson's receptionist – a woman that works for Dr. Martinson's doctor office. Shows complete lack of love interest of Kevin. Seen in the episode titled, "Split Decision".
 Jean Speegle Howard as Mrs. Baker – the practical next door neighbor of Kevin, Mary-Kate, Ashley, and Mr. Fillmore. Mrs. Baker is Mr. Fillmore's main love interest. Mrs. Baker originally baby sits for the girls until she meets Mr. Fillmore and Kevin has no choice but to hire Carrie. Mrs. Baker is Kevin's favorite baby sitter. If Carrie is unable to baby sit Mary-Kate and Ashley Mrs. Baker fills in for her. Mrs. Baker enjoys knitting and watching South Park. Mrs. Baker and Mr. Fillmore begin dating as of "Putting Two 'n Two Together".
 Rance Howard as Mr. Fillmore – a friendly man who lives next door to the Burkes and Mrs. Baker. Mr. Fillmore falls in love and begins to date Mrs. Baker in the pilot episode "Putting Two 'n Two Together".

Theme music and opening sequence
The theme music which accompanied the opening title sequence was composed by Jesse Frederick and Bennett Salvay, and was the second theme composed by Frederick and Salvay that does not include lyrics, coming after The Family Man, which was also produced by Miller-Boyett.

The opening sequence varied slightly from week to week, featured clips of Kevin, Carrie and the girls playing in the park. The scenes, which always slightly vary, include the girls rollerblading, the girls on the swing with Carrie, the girls playing frisbee with Kevin, Carrie and Kevin playing basketball, Carrie, Kevin and the girls playing a very large beach ball, the girls doing cartwheels and jumping around barefoot. The opening sequence only includes the show title and the executive producers' names, unlike previous Miller-Boyett series, whose opening sequences featured the cast and producers names in the sequence. The names of the show's cast members were instead shown in the opening teaser, prior to the opening credits.

Episodes

Broadcast and syndication
After its cancellation, the show gained more of an audience when reruns began airing on ABC Family in the United States. It ran on the network starting in 1999 (a few months after its cancellation), when the network was Fox Family, and continued after the channel's purchase by Disney until 2004. ABC Family separated the closing credits and the tag scene, in the manner that they originally aired on ABC.

In Italy, it aired on Disney Channel under the name Due gemelle e una tata (Two Twins and a Nanny) from January until February 2004.

In the United Kingdom, reruns of the series also aired on Nickelodeon, Disney Channel and Pop Girl. The international networks ran the closing credits over the tag scene.

Books
Some episodes were written and released as books. Some other Two of a Kind novels were just made up by the authors. As of December 16, 2006, 40 books have been released. Some of the books are in the "Two of a Kind Diaries" subseries, where they are written in the girls' perspectives, as if they are writing in a diary. The first book is "It's a Twin Thing". Initially, the books are actually simplified versions of the episode scripts, while currently, they just feature its main characters.

Despite the lack of success for the television series, the books are more successful towards children and pre-teens.

 It's a Twin Thing 
 How to Flunk Your First Date 
 The Sleepover Secret
 One Twin Too Many 
 To Snoop or Not to Snoop? 
 My Sister the Super-model
 Two's a Crowd
 Let's Party!
 Calling All Boys (Diaries subseries, #1)
 Winner Take All (Diaries subseries, #2)
 P.S. Wish You Were Here (Diaries subseries, #3)
 The Cool Club
 War of the Wardrobes
 Bye-Bye Boyfriend
 It's Snow Problem
 Likes Me, Likes Me Not
 Shore Thing (Diaries subseries, #4)
 Two For The Road (Diaries subseries, #5)
 Surprise, Surprise
 Sealed With a Kiss
 Now You See Him, Now You Don't
 April Fools Rules
 Island Girls (Diaries subseries, #6)
 Surf, Sand & Secrets (Diaries subseries, #7)
 Closer Than Ever
 The Perfect Gift
 The Facts About Flirting
 The Dream Date Debate
 Love Set Match (Diaries subseries, #8)
 Making A Splash (Diaries subseries, #9)
 Dare To Scare (Diaries subseries, #10)
 Santa Girls (Diaries subseries, #11)
 Heart to Heart (Diaries subseries, #12)
 Prom Princess (Diaries subseries, #13)
 Camp Rock 'n' Roll (Diaries subseries, #14)
 Twist and Shout (Diaries subseries, #15)
 Hocus-pocus (Diaries subseries, #16)
 Holiday Magic (Diaries subseries, #17)
 Candles, Cake, Celebrate! (Diaries subseries, #18)
 Wish on a Star (Diaries subseries, #19)

References

External links 
 

 

1990s American teen sitcoms
1998 American television series debuts
1999 American television series endings
American Broadcasting Company original programming
English-language television shows
Television series by Warner Bros. Television Studios
Television shows set in Chicago
TGIF (TV programming block)
Television series about children
Television series about families
Television series about sisters
Television series about twins
Works about twin sisters
Twins in fiction